Australia competed at the 2011 World Aquatics Championships in Shanghai, China from 16 to 31 July 2011. Australian athletes have competed in every FINA World Aquatics Championships. Swimming Australia sent a total of 97 athletes to the Championships to compete in all 5 sports.

Medalists

Diving

Australia will send 7 divers to the 2011 World Aquatics Championships.

Men

Women

Open water swimming

Men

Women

Mixed

Swimming

Australia qualified 47 swimmers.

Men (23): Matthew Abood, Sam Ashby, Craig Calder, Ashley Delaney, Tommaso D'Orsogna, Thomas Fraser-Holmes, Jayden Hadler, Geoff Huegill, Jarrod Killey, Mitch Larkin, James Magnussen, Kenrick Monk, Ryan Napoleon, Travis Nederpelt, Kyle Richardson, Brenton Rickard, James Roberts, Christian Sprenger, Hayden Stoeckel, Eamon Sullivan, Matthew Targett, Kenneth To, Ben Treffers

Women (24): Jessica Ashwood, Angie Bainbridge, Bronte Barratt, Alicia Coutts, Merindah Dingjan, Blair Evans, Sally Foster, Katie Goldman, Melissa Gorman (pool and open water), Marieke Guehrer, Olivia Halicek, Samantha Hamill, Belinda Hocking, Leisel Jones, Rebecca Kemp, Yolane Kukla, Meagen Nay, Jade Neilsen, Kylie Palmer, Leiston Pickett, Stephanie Rice, Jessicah Schipper, Emily Seebohm, Kelly Stubbins

Men

 * raced in heats only

Women

 * raced in heats only

Synchronised swimming

Australia has qualified 10 athletes in synchronised swimming.

Women

Reserves
Amie Thompson

Water polo

Men

Team Roster 

Joel Dennerley
Richard Campbell
Timothy Cleland
Mitchell Baird
Robert Maitland
Anthony Martin
Aidan Joseph Roach
Samuel McGregor – Captain
Aaron Younger
Gavin Woods
Rhys Howden
William Miller
Luke Quinliven

Group B

Playoff round

Classification 9–12

Ninth place game

Women

Team Roster

Alicia McCormack
Gemma Jane Beadsworth
Sophie Elizabeth Smith
Rebecca Marie Rippon
Jane Moran
Alice Bronwen Knox
Rowena Evelyn Webster
Kate Maree Gynther – Captain
Glencora Ralph
Holly Jane Lincoln Smith
Melissa Alison Rippon
Nicola Maree Zagame
Victoria Jayne Brown

Group B

Playoff round

Quarterfinals

Classification 5–8

Fifth place game

References

Nations at the 2011 World Aquatics Championships
World Aquatics Championships
Australia at the World Aquatics Championships